Edward Manners may refer to:

Edward Manners, 3rd Earl of Rutland (1548–1587) English nobleman and son of Henry Manners, 2nd Earl of Rutland
Lord Edward Manners (1864–1903), British Conservative politician, son of the 7th Duke of Rutland